Rap Essentials Volume One is a Canadian hip hop compilation album, released in 1996 on Beat Factory Music, and distributed by EMI Music Canada. It is considered a landmark hip-hop album, and it was very influential.

Three songs from the album—"Naughty Dread" by Kardinal Offishall, "Fitnredi" by Rascalz, and "Bright Lights, Big City" by Scales Empire—were nominated for Best Rap Recording at the 1997 Juno Awards. "Dear Hip Hop" by Dan-e-o is considered a Canadian hip-hop classic.

Music videos for "Dear Hip Hop", "Bright Lights, Big City", and "Sunlight" by Wio-K were put into rotation on MuchMusic.

Track listing

Samples
"Learn to Earn" – Contains a sample of "Paid in Full" by Eric B. & Rakim
"Naughty Dread" – Contains a sample of "Natty Dread" by Bob Marley & The Wailers
"Dear Hip Hop" – Contains a sample of "The Look of Love" by Ramsey Lewis

See also

Canadian hip hop
Music of Canada

References

1996 compilation albums
Albums produced by Kardinal Offishall
Compilation albums by Canadian artists
EMI Records compilation albums
Hip hop compilation albums